Roberto Ramón "Chato" Alemán Zubieta (2 October 1921 – 18 July 2009) was a Panamanian lawyer, diplomat, politician and businessman. He served as Ambassador of Panama to the United States from 1968 to 1969.

In 1951, he married María Teresa Healy Quelquejeu (born 1928), who was a descendant of the wealthy de Roux family. Together they had six children, including the diplomat Jaime Eduardo (born 1953) and politician José Miguel (born 1958).

Alemán Zubieta died on 18 July 2009 at the age of 88 in Panama City, following a long illness.

References

1921 births
2009 deaths
Ambassadors of Panama to the United States
Panamanian businesspeople
20th-century Panamanian lawyers
Panamanian politicians
20th-century businesspeople